Pornophonique is a German electronic duo from Darmstadt, Germany. It was formed by Kai Richter and Felix Heuser. They use a Commodore 64 and a Game Boy to produce their trademark 8-bit electronica sound. While guitarist and singer Richter also handles the C64, Heuser is responsible for the Game Boy sounds. They describe themselves as “ meets Lagerfeuer” (Game Boy meets campfire).

 In 2003, both decided to start a project called Pornophonique, but due to the little response from labels, Richter and Heuser decided to provide their music on the Internet for free.

In 2007 they released their debut album 8-bit Lagerfeuer which includes eight songs about topics like sad robots and the loneliness in the dungeon of a computer role-playing game. Pornophonique performed at more than 100 concerts in five different countries (Austria, Germany, the Netherlands, Switzerland and Portugal).

Discography
 2007: 8-bit Lagerfeuer (Album)
 2020: Brave New World (Album)

References

External links
  (German)
 Pornophonique at Jamendo
 
 
 
  (German)

Electronic music duos
German musical groups